Cherry Valley is a town just south of Lebanon Tennessee Wilson County, in the U.S. state of Tennessee.

History
Cherry Valley was platted in 1848. A post office called Cherry Valley was established in 1850, and remained in operation until 1904.

References

Unincorporated communities in Wilson County, Tennessee
Unincorporated communities in Tennessee